I Never Loved a Man the Way I Love You is the tenth studio album by American singer Aretha Franklin released on March 10, 1967, by Atlantic Records. It was Franklin's first release under her contract with the label, following her departure from Columbia Records after nine unsuccessful Jazz standard albums, and marked a commercial breakthrough for her, becoming her first top 10 album in the United States, reaching number 2 on the Billboard 200. Two singles were released to promote the album: "Respect" and "I Never Loved a Man (The Way I Love You)". The former topped the Billboard Hot 100, while latter reached the top 10.

Although released to mixed critical response, the album over the years has been reappraised and is now regarded among one of the greatest and most influential albums, being included in Rolling Stones "500 Greatest Albums of All Time" list, as well as in the book 1001 Albums You Must Hear Before You Die. The second single from the album "Respect" became Franklin's signature song and is ranked by the Rolling Stone as the greatest song of all-time.

Background
I Never Loved a Man the Way I Love You is Aretha's first album with Atlantic Records. The title track was recorded at FAME Studios in Muscle Shoals, Alabama. After an altercation broke out between Franklin's then husband, Ted White, trumpeter Ken Laxton and FAME studios owner/producer Rick Hall, producer Jerry Wexler arranged to continue recording the LP at Atlantic Studios, New York.  The B-side, "Do Right Woman, Do Right Man" was unfinished at FAME studios as the session ended abruptly. Members of the Muscle Shoals rhythm section were flown to New York to complete "Do Right Woman" and a number of other tracks (including "Respect"). There was a discrepancy in the tape recording speeds of the two studios. The foundation track of "Do Right Woman" recorded at Muscle Shoals and the later tracks added at Atlantic's New York studio are slightly out of tune with each other: Producer Chips Moman regretted that the piano was faintly sharp.

The record spent several weeks at #2 on the main Billboard album chart and 14 weeks at number 1 in the magazine's Top R&B Albums chart. It was certified Gold by the RIAA in 1967, eventually selling nearly two million. It was voted number 352 in the third edition of Colin Larkin's All Time Top 1000 Albums (2000). It received a number 83 ranking on Rolling Stone magazine's 2003 list of the 500 greatest albums of all time, 84 in a 2012 revised list and 13 in the 2020 edition. The album was also included in both the 1001 Albums You Must Hear Before You Die (2005) and 1,000 Recordings to Hear Before You Die (2008). When Rolling Stone listed the "Women in Rock: 50 Essential Albums" in 2002 and again 2012, the album listed at number one.  The album included two top-10 singles: "Respect" was a number-1 single on Billboards Hot 100 Pop singles chart, and "I Never Loved a Man (The Way I Love You)" peaked at number 9. The album was rated the 10th best album of the 1960s by Pitchfork.

Reception
In 1967, Rolling Stone chided the album for "the lack of versatility on the part of the sidemen. The drums weren't hard enough, the guitar was weak, and the production lacked polish." In 2003, the album was ranked  on Rolling Stones list of "The 500 Greatest Albums of All Time". Music Critic Robert Christgau, gave the album an A, stating "Not all of the tracks sound inspired" but also stating that it was the best album she had made by that point. Q included the album in their list of the "100 Greatest Albums Ever". Q also gave the album 4 stars and said "[the album] came out in May 1967 and was number 2 in America within weeks ... now it stands untainted by time. She seemed so much a force of nature it's strange to recall that this was actually her tenth album ..."

In the obituary for Aretha Franklin, Rolling Stone made this comment about I Never Loved a Man the Way I Love You: "It puts the emphasis not just on the great songs, or the amazing music, but on the person speaking them, her world, her story and whatever journey she's on in life. It rings out like revealed truth happening in real time, a declaration of independence".

Track listing

Personnel

Musicians
Source:

Aretha Franklin – piano, vocals
Spooner Oldham – keyboards, piano
Jimmy Johnson, Chips Moman – guitar
Tommy Cogbill – bass guitar
Gene Chrisman, Roger Hawkins – drums
Melvin Lastie – trumpet
Charles Chalmers, King Curtis – tenor saxophone
Willie Bridges	– baritone saxophone
Carolyn Franklin – background vocals
Erma Franklin – background vocals
Cissy Houston – background vocals

Technical
 Title track produced by Rick Hall (FAME Studios, Muscle Shoals, AL), Remaining tracks Jerry Wexler (Atlantic Recording Studios, New York, NY)
Tom Dowd – arranger, recording engineer
Arif Mardin – recording engineer
Loring Eutemey – cover design
Jerry Schatzberg – cover photography

Charts

See also
Album era
List of number-one R&B albums of 1967 (U.S.)

References

1967 albums
Aretha Franklin albums
Albums produced by Jerry Wexler
Atlantic Records albums
Rhino Records albums
Southern soul albums